Thomas Page may refer to:

Thomas Page (MP) in 1558, MP for Rochester
Thomas Page (King's), vice-chancellor of the University of Cambridge in 1676
Thomas Hyde Page (1746–1821), British military engineer and cartographer
Thomas Scudder Page (1800–1877), American politician
Thomas Page (engineer) (1803–1877), British civil engineer
Thomas Jefferson Page (1808–1899), United States Navy officer
Thomas Ethelbert Page (1850–1936), British classicist
Thomas Nelson Page (1853–1922), American author, lawyer, and ambassador
Thomas Page (cricketer) (1872–1953), English cricketer
Thomas Spurgeon Page (1879–1958), Northern Rhodesian politician
Tom Page (footballer) (1888–1973), English soccer player
Tom Page (American football), American football coach
Tommy Page (1970–2017), American singer-songwriter